Kannad Gothilla is a 2019 Indian Kannada-language thriller film written and directed by Mayuraa Raghavendra making his debut. It is produced by Kumar Kanteerva under his banner Shri Ramarathna Productions. The film stars Hariprriya and Sudharani. The music for the film is scored by Nakul Abhyankar. The cinematography and editing is done by Giridhar Divan.

Cast 
 Hariprriya as Shruthi Chakravarthy
 Sudharani
Mayur Raghavendra
Dharmanna
Tuhinanshu Chaturvedi
Ashlesh Raj 
Shlagha Saligrama
Yogi Babu as himself
Karunakaran as Pillaiyar

Production 
The film was produced by Kumar Kanteerava. The film was announced on 6 September 2018. The film started to roll on the same day . The film wrapped up on 19 December 2018. The film recently announced that they are hunting for new singers to sing the title track of the film. The team left the track of the title track on PRK Audio Channel . 
.

Soundtrack 
The soundtrack for the film is done by Nakul Abhyankar. The Audio Rights of the film has been sold to PRK Audio.

Release 
The film was first schedule to release on 15 November 2019, but it was postponed to 22 November 2019.

Notes

References

External links
 

2010s Kannada-language films
2019 thriller films
2019 films
Indian thriller films
2019 directorial debut films
Films shot in Mysore
Films shot in Bangalore